Deh-e Gol Mir (also Romanized as Deh-e Gol Mīr; also known as Golmīr) is a village in Dust Mohammad Rural District, in the Central District of Hirmand County, Sistan and Baluchestan Province, Iran. At the 2006 census, its population was 128, in 27 families.

References 

Populated places in Hirmand County